Once in Every Life is an album by vocalist Johnny Hartman which was recorded in 1980 and released on the Bee Hive label.

Four songs from the album, "Easy Living", "I See Your Face Before Me", "It Was Almost Like a Song" and "For All We Know", were used on the soundtrack of the 1995 movie The Bridges of Madison County, posthumously burnishing Hartman's exposure and reputation.

Reception

The AllMusic review by Scott Yanow stated, "Johnny Hartman's next-to-last album finds the 57-year-old singer still in prime form. His rich baritone voice is joined by a sextet ... The ballads range from slow to a brighter medium-tempo pace, and Hartman shows that he still had it this late in his career".

Track listing

EDIT : Last song ("Moonlight in Vermont") is not found here (https://www.discogs.com/release/1812303-Johnny-Hartman-Once-In-Every-Life), "Johnny Hartman" is not found there (https://en.wikipedia.org/wiki/Moonlight_in_Vermont_(song)), and the length of the songs 1 to 9 = 39:43.
Regards,
--
jpt

Personnel
Johnny Hartman – vocals
Joe Wilder – trumpet, flugelhorn
Frank Wess – tenor saxophone, flute
Billy Taylor – piano
Al Gafa — guitar
Victor Gaskin – bass 
Keith Copeland – drums

References

Johnny Hartman albums
1980 albums
Bee Hive Records albums